Sasse Ni Sasse Tu Khusiyan Ch Vasse ( "May you live in happiness, mother in law") is an Indian Punjabi language television series that premiered from 25 April 2022 and ended on 23 September 2022 which aired on Zee Punjabi. It starred Kanchan Rai, Dil Dilveer and Preety Parri in the lead roles. It is an official remake of Zee Marathi's TV series Aggabai Sasubai.

Plot 
A daughter-in-law defies societal norms and facilitates the wedding of her mother-in-law despite facing several odds for the sake of her happiness.

Cast 
 Kanchan Rai as Ramneek
 Dil Dilveer as Vikrant
 Preety Pari as Amrita
 Sunit Sharma as Soham
 Gurpreet Sarwara
 Shweta Sarangal
 VJ Aman

Adaptations

References

External links 
 
 Sasse Ni Sasse Tu Khusiyan Ch Vasse at ZEE5

2022 Indian television series debuts
2022 Indian television series endings
Punjabi-language television shows
Zee Punjabi original programming